The Robosapien V2 is the second generation of Mark Tilden's Robosapien robot. Instead of the original caveman grunts, the V2 can speak a large list of pre-recorded phrases. It has infrared and basic color recognition sensors, grip sensors in its hands, touch or contact activated hand and foot sensors, and sonic sensors. For movement, the V2 has an articulated waist, shoulders, and hands giving him a variety of body animations.

Overview 
The Robosapien V2 model was designed by Mark Tilden and is an autonomous robot. The Robosapien V2 comes packaged with a remote, and the robot. It is an "evolved" form of Robosapien V1.

Additional features 
The V2 comes with a repertoire of sayings and animations which can be activated from the remote control. Features from the original Robosapien such as burp and fart are included, along with a parody of the Lost In Space robot's "Danger, Will Robinson!" and many other one-liners.

Much of the V2's internal behavior can be deduced by the blinking patterns of his blue eye pads, which change as the V2 changes modes.

See also
WowWee
Humanoid robot
Roboraptor
Roboreptile
WowWee Alive Chimpanzee
Robotics

References

External links 
RoboCommunity - The official WowWee Robotics user community (run by Capable Networks LLC)
The Evolution of Robosapien V2 (in pictures)
Robosapien V2 - V2 News & Tips
Robosapien V2 Review - Blog for Robosapien V2 fans
Robosapien V2 Hacks - An examination of the Robosapien V2's internal circuitry
Welcoming our new robot overlords - Ars Technica review
Marcus @ Evosapien - Various Robobosapien V2 hacks
 web site RoboDance for control Robots Wow Wee

2000s toys
Entertainment robots
Bipedal humanoid robots
WowWee
2000s robots

fr:Robosapien V2